Bob Payne is an American puppeteer and puppet builder. He is also known as Robert Payne and Bobby Payne.

History
Payne, a native of Washington, D.C., was a college friend of Jim Henson and Jane Henson. He first worked with them on Jim Henson's show Sam and Friends as a backup puppeteer. He even took part in some of Jim Henson's advertising where he was the principal performer of the Mirinda Craver from the Mirinda commercials.

Payne later went on to build several characters for The Muppet Show and other projects where he did occasional puppeteering.

He later received a special credit as a historian in The Muppets: A Celebration of 30 Years.

Filmography

Television
 Mister Rogers' Neighborhood - Himself
 Sam and Friends - Additional Muppets
 Sesame Street - Telly Monster, Additional Muppets
 The Muppet Show - Astoria, Additional Muppets
 John Denver and the Muppets: A Christmas Together - Additional Muppets
 The Muppets Go to the Movies - Additional Muppets

Film
 The Dark Crystal - SkekOk/The Scroll Keeper (performer)
 The Great Muppet Caper - Additional Muppets
 The Muppet Movie - Additional Muppets

Advertising
 Mirinda - Mirinda Craver

Puppet designer works
 Sesame Street - Builder of the original Telly Monster puppet
 Tales of the Tinkerdee - Palace Guard's helmet (later used as part of Super Grover's outfit) 
 The Dark Crystal - Podlings fabrication team
 The Muppet Show - Builder for Mulch, Pinocchio, Punch and Judy, and others

External links
 

American puppeteers
Living people
Muppet performers
Year of birth missing (living people)